"Chemical Reaction" is a song by German singer Sasha. It was written by Sasha, Pete Boyd Smith, Michael Kersting, and Stephan Baader  for Sasha's second studio album ...you (2000), while production was overseen by the latter two. Released as the album's second single, it reached number seven in the Flemish portion of Belgium and the top 40 in Austria, Germany and Switzerland.

Credits and personnel 
Credits adapted from the liner notes of ...you

Music and lyrics – Pomez di Lorenzo, Grant Michael B.
Lead and backing vocals – Sasha
Mixing – Falk Moller, Michael B.

Charts

Weekly charts

References

External links 
 

2000 singles
2000 songs
Sasha (German singer) songs